Asbjørn Ingvart Klausen Lindhjem (4 February 1910  –  15 November 1994) was a Norwegian politician for the Labour Party.

He was born in Brunlanes.

He served as a deputy representative to the Norwegian Parliament from Vestfold during the term 1969–1973.

Lindhjem held various positions in Brunlanes municipality council from 1959 to 1975. He was a member of Vestfold county council during the term 1971–1975.

References

1910 births
1994 deaths
Labour Party (Norway) politicians
Vestfold politicians
People from Larvik
Deputy members of the Storting